Apasionada is a 1993 Argentine telenovela produced by Televisa for Canal 13. It is a remake of the Chilean telenovela La Colorina.

Cast
 Susu Pecoraro  – "Dolores Nelson"
 Dario Grandinetti –  "Patricio Velasco"
 Carlos Estrada –  "Francisco Velasco"
 Andrea Bonelli – "Martha Suárez"
 Pablo Brichta  – "Benigno Rios"
 Alejandra da Passano –  "Annie Guzmán"
 Mauricio Dayub  – "Martin Pelayo"
 Oscar Ferreiro  – "Nicolas Estévez" y "Rodolfo"
 Susana Lanteri  – "Etelvina"
 Ernesto Larresse  – "Fabián"
 Claribel Medina  – "Betina"
 Boy Olmi  – "Enrique"
 Carola Reyna –  "Claudia"
 Veronica Ruano –  "Ines"
 Gabriela Toscano –  "Rosarito"
 Tony Vilas –  "Joaquin"
 Sandra Dominguez  – "Liliana"
 Maria Rosa Fugazot  – "Julia"
 Elena Perez Rueda  – "Margarita"
 Victor Hugo Vieyra - "Octavio Velasco"

References

Argentine telenovelas
1993 telenovelas
El Trece telenovelas
Spanish-language telenovelas